Jonathan Sinclair (born 1970), British diplomat and Governor of Pitcairn, 2014–2017

Jonathan Sinclair or Jon Sinclair may also refer to:

Jon Sinclair (athlete) in USA Cross Country Championships
Jonathan Sinclair, executive producer of Oprah: Where Are They Now?

See also
Jack Sinclair (disambiguation)
John Sinclair (disambiguation)